Aegean may refer to:

Aegean Sea
Aegean Islands
Aegean Region (geographical), Turkey
Aegean Region (statistical), Turkey
Aegean civilizations
Aegean languages, a group of ancient languages and proposed language family
Aegean Sea (theme), a naval theme of the Byzantine Empire
Aegean Airlines
Aegean Macedonia, an irredentist term for the Greek region of Macedonia
Aegean Records, independent record label founded by singer and songwriter George Michael
University of the Aegean, a university based in Mytilene, Greece
Ege University, a university based in İzmir, Turkey
Aegean (stage), part of the Triassic system in stratigraphy
Aegean cat, a cat breed from Greece
Aegean Contagion, an alternate name to the 2010 European sovereign debt crisis with reference to its point of origin and a general term for an epidemic
 Aegean (album)

See also 
 North Aegean
 South Aegean
 Archipelago